Cajo Mario is an opera seria in 3 acts by composer Niccolò Jommelli. The opera's Italian language libretto by Gaetano Roccaforte is based on Lucius Anneus Florus's Tito Livio e Plutarco. All of the parts are written for castrati, except for the title role, written for a Tenor. The work premiered on 6 February 1746 at the Teatro Argentina in Rome.

Roles

References

Operas
1746 operas
Italian-language operas
Opera seria
Operas by Niccolò Jommelli